FK Železničar Lajkovac (Serbian Cyrillic: ФК Железничар Лајковац) is a football club based in Lajkovac, Serbia.

History
The club was formed in 1927 by the initiative of a group of important citizens of Lajkovac and was initially named as Sport Klub Železničar (SK Železničar). The first matches took place only in 1929 the year when the first field was made. The chairman of the club was Mr. Aleksandar Drašković who was the person who brought the first football to the town and was also in this initial period the club's main player. Since the owner of the field didn't allowed the tree that was standing in the halfline to be cut the club had to move to a new one. But, it was soon, after this anegdotical event, that the club settled in a new definitive field in 1933, when the new club president, Dr. Eng. Miroslav Marković was already in charge. That year the club was registered in the Football Federation of Belgrade and it qualified to the league of the county of Kolubara.

Between 1934 and 1937 the club had some difficulties to form a squad, but it was in 1938 that the club returns to competition. The locals remember with enthusiasm the train travels they made to follow the team in their visiting matches. In the season 1938–39 three players are called to represent the team of the Kolubara county: Miladin Ilić, Jakov Vidović and Dunda Kučenović. However, the best club player of this period was Stanko Milovanović, nicknamed Pop ("The priest"), who played at the higher lever with several times national champions, Belgrade's SK Jugoslavija and later for FK Partizan.

The Second World War marked a period when in the town other clubs were formed: Omladinac in 1943, and ŽAK in 1944. In the latter played the Yugoslav national team player Broćić. During the war, Železničar had been disbanded, but with the liberation of Yugoslavia in 1945 and by the initiative of the citizens of the town, the club was formed again and Omladinac was merged with all their players joining the club.

By the end of 1946 and beginning of 1947 the town lives a sports revival. The Serbian Gymnastics Federation opens its branch in the town, and there is created a section dedicated to athletics named "Partizan". Železničar also creates sections dedicated to chess and handball. As curiosity, many players that were Serbian handball champions in 1947 were also footballers in the club. That year, the football club begins competing from beginning, in the league of the sub-federation of Valjevo. Thanks to the Serbian Gymnastics Federation sports and physical culture gain massive impulse in the town. The school centers and the clubs are modernized and Železničar receives a new field to develop. In this period the work with youth teams gets special attention. In 1953 the club achieves promotion to League of the Belgrade sub-federation. In this decade the club usually competed at this level, and the important players worth naming beside the club's top scorer Kalman Sabov and the captain Dr. Miodrag Banković, are Milorad Ivanović and Radomir Ilić. Since the 1960s until the breakaway of Yugoslavia the club competes mostly in the league of the sub-federation of Kolubara.

It is perhaps in the late 1990s until 2002 that the club achieved its maximum success by participating in the Second League of FR Yugoslavia. The participation of the club in national level several consecutive seasons gave to the club some prestige that was missing earlier. But by the middle 2000s the club has fallen again to further lower leagues managing to return in 2007 to the Serbian League West (3rd national tier) a level that has been maintained for four consecutive seasons, by 2011.

References

External sources
 Official website
 Club profile and squad at Srbijafudbal

Football clubs in Serbia
Association football clubs established in 1927
1927 establishments in Serbia
Lajkovac